Trevalgan (from , meaning "Maelgon's settlement") is a hamlet in the parish of Saint Ives, Cornwall, England, United Kingdom.

References

Hamlets in Cornwall